Etzdorf is a German surname, often used with the nobiliary particle "von". Notable people with the surname include:

Georgina von Etzdorf (born 1955), British textile designer
Marga von Etzdorf (1907–1933), German aviator

German-language surnames